The Chairman of the Joint Chiefs of Staff is the highest-ranking and most senior military officer in the Republic of Korea Armed Forces.

List
Previous Chairmen have been:

Chairman of the Combined Chiefs of Staff

Director of the Joint Staff

Chairman of the Joint Chiefs of Staff

References

External links
 R.O.K. Joint Chiefs of Staff (Official Website) 

Military of South Korea
Korea, Republic of
Joint military units and formations of South Korea